Nikola Đurković (born 3 January 1994) is a Montenegrin football midfielder who plays for Canadian Soccer League club Serbian White Eagles FC.

Career

Montenegro 
He started in his hometown club Budućnost Podgorica. In 2014, he arrived in Zabjelo, where he stayed for one season, usually playing as a defensive midfielder. He then moved to Dečić which marked his return to the Montenegrin top tier. In his debut season with the Tuzi-based club, he appeared in five matches. Following a season with Dečić he returned to the country's second division to sign with his hometown club Kom where he stayed for four years.  

In his debut season with Kom, he helped the club secure promotion to the first division by winning the league title. The 2017–18 season marked his third stint in the top flight where he appeared in 27 matches and recorded 2 goals. The club was relegated the following season where Đurković remained with the club and assisted in securing promotion back to the first division during the 2018–19 season. In his final season with Kom, he made 24 appearances and registered 1 goal. 

In 2020, he signed with league rivals Jezero. Đurković would make 31 appearances for the club in his debut season. He re-signed with Jezero for the following season where he featured in 28 matches with 3 goals.

Canada 
Đurković began to play abroad by joining the Serbian White Eagles prior to the 2022 season. He recorded his first goal for the Serbs in his debut match against FC Continentals on May 29, 2022. Several weeks after he recorded a hattrick against BGHC FC on June 19, 2022. He helped the western Toronto side secure the regular season title which automatically clinched a playoff berth for the club. However, the Serbs were eliminated in the opening round of the playoffs to the Continentals.

Honors 
Serbian White Eagles

 Canadian Soccer League Regular Season: 2022

References

External links
 Nikola Đurković at livesport.com 
 

1994 births
Living people
Footballers from Podgorica
Association football midfielders
Montenegrin footballers
Montenegrin expatriate footballers
Serbian White Eagles FC players
Montenegrin First League players
Canadian Soccer League (1998–present) players
FK Budućnost Podgorica players
FK Zabjelo players
FK Dečić players
FK Kom players
FK Jezero players
Montenegrin Second League players